IWB may refer to:

 Inside-the-waistband holsters, a category of handgun holster
 Interactive whiteboard, a large interactive display in the form factor of a whiteboard
 iShares Russell 1000 (ticker: IWB), an exchange-traded fund of US stocks

 may refer to: